"Take Off" is the debut Japanese single by South Korean boy band, 2PM. This single was released  on May 18, 2011 in 4 editions: CD+DVD, CD+Photobook, CD only limited and a Regular edition. The song was used as ending song theme for the first 12 episodes of Season 1 of the Blue Exorcist anime series. It peaked no. 4 in Oricon's Weekly singles chart with 59,059 sold in the first week.

Composition 
The B-side is a Japanese version of their Korean song "Heartbeat", which is the lead single of their first Korean album 1:59PM.

Track listing

Charts

References

External links
 Official Website
 Official Japanese Website

2011 singles
Dance-pop songs
Japanese-language songs
2PM songs
2011 songs
Ariola Japan singles
Songs written by Park Jin-young